Claudio Herrera may refer to:

 Claudio Herrera (musician), Mexican pianist
 Claudio Herrera (footballer) (born 1988), Uruguayan footballer